De damescoupeur is a 1919 Dutch silent comedy film directed by Maurits Binger.

Cast
 Cor Ruys - Jacques, de damescoupeur
 Henny Schroeder - Mevr. Georgette
 Jeanne Van der Pers - Lily
 Paula de Waart - Polly
 Kitty Kluppell - Mannequin
 Yvonne George - Mannequin

External links 
 

Dutch silent feature films
1919 films
Dutch black-and-white films
1919 comedy films
Films directed by Maurits Binger
Dutch comedy films
Silent comedy films